Canadian Harness Horse of the Year is an annual award in the sport of harness racing in Canada. It is the most prestigious Canadian award among those given to a Standardbred horse. Part of the O'Brien Award program, named in honour of legendary Canadian driver / trainer Joe O'Brien since 1989, the Horse of the Year award honours the top performing pacer or trotter in Canadian racing. In 2018, Standardbred Canada renamed the award to the Somebeachsomewhere Horse of the Year to honour the late champion, who passed away earlier that year.
Operated by Standardbred Canada, its website states that "every media person across Canada who covers harness racing on a regular basis receives a ballot, this includes writers for the various trade publications as well as those in print, radio and television. All Canadian race secretaries and track publicists also participate in the voting," and that "The voters' list is vigorously scrutinized each year with names added and deleted when necessary."

Historical notes
Through 2022, Somebeachsomewhere is the only horse win the award twice.

Both Western Dreamer in 1997 and Blissfull Hall in 1999 won the U.S. Pacing Triple Crown.

In 1996 and again in 2007 there was a tie.

Past winners

† - tie

References

Harness racing in Canada
Canadian harness racing awards